Prasanna S Kumar is an Indian cinematographer who was born in Chennai, Tamil Nadu.He is cousin brother of director Sasi who directed many films including Pichaikaran.At his early stage, he was associated with cinematographer Muthiah in movie Poo. After a couple of years' experience with him, he then moved on to DOP Ratnavel who is well known as “Randy”, where he worked in movies like David, Haridas and 1: Nenokkadine. He also associated with Ravi K Chandran. He made his debut in director Sasi's Pichaikkaran. He is now currently working in director Kannan's Ivan Thanthiran.

Filmography

All films are in Tamil, unless otherwise noted.

References

Cinematographers from Tamil Nadu
Artists from Chennai
1987 births
Living people
Tamil film cinematographers